"That's What Cowboys Do" is a song by American country music singer Garth Brooks. It was released on June 29, 2021, as the fifth single from Brooks' fourteenth studio album Fun. Brooks co-wrote the song with John Martin and Mitch Rossell.

Background
In an interview, Brooks said: "It was written for the boys from Midland. 'Cause I thought they would kill it. We sat down and wrote something for them, because they do a lot of George Strait-feeling stuff."

Content
The song was described by CMT as a story about "timeless tale of love, heartbreak and the rodeo" and a rodeo cowboy who "falls for, then leaves, their love interest". Chris Parton of Sounds like Nashville felt that the "pure-country ballad" song features "a gentle sway and a timeless theme. Brooks plays a cowboy who can't be tamed, drifting from one rodeo arena and one bed to the next."

Critical reception
Katie Maloney of Outsider commented that the song has "90s country vibes". Robyn Collins of Taste of Country described it as "a traditional country tune that features slide guitars and fiddles so classic that listeners can almost see boot-wearing couples making their way around the dance floor.

In November 2022, the song was honored as one of the Most Performed Country Songs of 2021 at the 60th Annual ASCAP Country Music Awards.

Charts

Weekly charts

Year-end charts

References

2021 singles
2021 songs
Garth Brooks songs
Songs written by Garth Brooks